The Girl from Rocky Point is a 1922 American silent drama film directed by Fred Becker and starring Milton Ross, Ora Carew and Gloria Joy.

Synopsis
A young woman falls in love with man shipwrecked on the Maine coastline, but has to contend with her stern father and a local mischief-maker determined to break up the romance.

Cast
 Milton Ross as 	Samuel Hayden
 Ora Carew as 	Betty
 Gloria Joy as 	Corrine
 Charles Spere as Daniel Williams
 E.G. Davidson as Timothy Smith
 Theodore von Eltz as Robert Giffing
 Verna Brooks as Mignon
 Walt Whitman as The Devil

References

Bibliography
 Connelly, Robert B. The Silents: Silent Feature Films, 1910-36, Volume 40, Issue 2. December Press, 1998.
 Munden, Kenneth White. The American Film Institute Catalog of Motion Pictures Produced in the United States, Part 1. University of California Press, 1997.

External links
 

1922 films
1922 drama films
1920s English-language films
American silent feature films
Silent American drama films
American black-and-white films
Films set in Maine
1920s American films